The Great Divide is a book by H. V. Hodson, written on the subject of partition of British India. The book is published by Oxford University Press.

References
OUP, Pakistan

1969 non-fiction books